Rašćane Gornje is a village in the Split-Dalmatia County, Croatia located in the Zagvozd municipality. In 2011 it was populated by 19 inhabitants.

References 

Rascane Gornje
Rascane Gornje